Ficus bahiensis is a species of tree. It is native to Brazil. The IUCN listed the species as least concern.

The fruits on the trees serve as an incubator for wasps in the genus Pegoscapus.

References 

bahiensis
Trees of Brazil